The 1967 VFL season was the 71st season of the Victorian Football League (VFL), the highest level senior Australian rules football competition in Victoria. The season featured twelve clubs, ran from 15 April until 23 September, and comprised an 18-game home-and-away season followed by a finals series featuring the top four clubs.

The premiership was won by the Richmond Football Club for the sixth time, after it defeated  by nine points in the 1967 VFL Grand Final.

Premiership season
In 1967, the VFL competition consisted of twelve teams of 18 on-the-field players each, plus two substitute players, known as the 19th man and the 20th man. A player could be substituted for any reason; however, once substituted, a player could not return to the field of play under any circumstances.

Teams played each other in a home-and-away season of 18 rounds; matches 12 to 18 were the "home-and-way reverse" of matches 1 to 7.

Once the 18 round home-and-away season had finished, the 1967 VFL Premiers were determined by the specific format and conventions of the Page–McIntyre system.

Round 1

|- style="background:#ccf;"
| Home team
| Home team score
| Away team
| Away team score
| Venue
| Crowd
| Date
|- style="background:#fff;"
| 
| 20.12 (132)
| 
| 15.12 (102)
| Glenferrie Oval
| 18,294
| 15 April 1967
|- style="background:#fff;"
| 
| 8.14 (62)
| 
| 9.13 (67)
| Arden Street Oval
| 13,690
| 15 April 1967
|- style="background:#fff;"
| 
| 22.13 (145)
| 
| 9.10 (64)
| Moorabbin Oval
| 28,564
| 15 April 1967
|- style="background:#fff;"
| 
| 15.20 (110)
| 
| 11.9 (75)
| MCG
| 56,387
| 15 April 1967
|- style="background:#fff;"
| 
| 13.13 (91)
| 
| 13.12 (90)
| Kardinia Park
| 35,151
| 15 April 1967
|- style="background:#fff;"
| 
| 5.6 (36)
| 
| 18.22 (130)
| Princes Park
| 24,211
| 15 April 1967

Round 2

|- style="background:#ccf;"
| Home team
| Home team score
| Away team
| Away team score
| Venue
| Crowd
| Date
|- style="background:#fff;"
| 
| 12.6 (78)
| 
| 8.22 (70)
| Western Oval
| 19,286
| 22 April 1967
|- style="background:#fff;"
| 
| 7.11 (53)
| 
| 8.8 (56)
| Windy Hill
| 26,100
| 22 April 1967
|- style="background:#fff;"
| 
| 16.17 (113)
| 
| 7.8 (50)
| Victoria Park
| 23,576
| 22 April 1967
|- style="background:#fff;"
| 
| 12.16 (88)
| 
| 6.8 (44)
| Princes Park
| 31,558
| 22 April 1967
|- style="background:#fff;"
| 
| 9.8 (62)
| 
| 14.11 (95)
| MCG
| 37,759
| 22 April 1967
|- style="background:#fff;"
| 
| 15.13 (103)
| 
| 10.5 (65)
| Lake Oval
| 11,739
| 22 April 1967

Round 3

|- style="background:#ccf;"
| Home team
| Home team score
| Away team
| Away team score
| Venue
| Crowd
| Date
|- style="background:#fff;"
| 
| 11.15 (81)
| 
| 7.5 (47)
| Kardinia Park
| 17,227
| 29 April 1967
|- style="background:#fff;"
| 
| 6.5 (41)
| 
| 11.13 (79)
| Western Oval
| 18,283
| 29 April 1967
|- style="background:#fff;"
| 
| 10.13 (73)
| 
| 8.9 (57)
| Princes Park
| 19,041
| 29 April 1967
|- style="background:#fff;"
| 
| 9.13 (67)
| 
| 10.9 (69)
| Moorabbin Oval
| 27,760
| 29 April 1967
|- style="background:#fff;"
| 
| 11.12 (78)
| 
| 7.11 (53)
| MCG
| 20,938
| 29 April 1967
|- style="background:#fff;"
| 
| 8.6 (54)
| 
| 10.16 (76)
| Windy Hill
| 34,600
| 29 April 1967

Round 4

|- style="background:#ccf;"
| Home team
| Home team score
| Away team
| Away team score
| Venue
| Crowd
| Date
|- style="background:#fff;"
| 
| 10.8 (68)
| 
| 11.22 (88)
| Arden Street Oval
| 12,750
| 6 May 1967
|- style="background:#fff;"
| 
| 10.6 (66)
| 
| 15.11 (101)
| Glenferrie Oval
| 20,352
| 6 May 1967
|- style="background:#fff;"
| 
| 9.10 (64)
| 
| 22.13 (145)
| Princes Park
| 9,747
| 6 May 1967
|- style="background:#fff;"
| 
| 13.17 (95)
| 
| 5.7 (37)
| Victoria Park
| 21,855
| 6 May 1967
|- style="background:#fff;"
| 
| 18.19 (127)
| 
| 13.10 (88)
| Lake Oval
| 18,756
| 6 May 1967
|- style="background:#fff;"
| 
| 5.15 (45)
| 
| 16.8 (104)
| MCG
| 48,513
| 6 May 1967

Round 5

|- style="background:#ccf;"
| Home team
| Home team score
| Away team
| Away team score
| Venue
| Crowd
| Date
|- style="background:#fff;"
| 
| 12.11 (83)
| 
| 12.10 (82)
| Western Oval
| 15,818
| 13 May 1967
|- style="background:#fff;"
| 
| 9.6 (60)
| 
| 13.13 (91)
| Princes Park
| 9,897
| 13 May 1967
|- style="background:#fff;"
| 
| 8.13 (61)
| 
| 10.12 (72)
| Windy Hill
| 24,100
| 13 May 1967
|- style="background:#fff;"
| 
| 13.25 (103)
| 
| 7.15 (57)
| Victoria Park
| 33,714
| 13 May 1967
|- style="background:#fff;"
| 
| 16.22 (118)
| 
| 5.13 (43)
| MCG
| 27,175
| 13 May 1967
|- style="background:#fff;"
| 
| 11.9 (75)
| 
| 11.14 (80)
| Moorabbin Oval
| 44,382
| 13 May 1967

Round 6

|- style="background:#ccf;"
| Home team
| Home team score
| Away team
| Away team score
| Venue
| Crowd
| Date
|- style="background:#fff;"
| 
| 7.9 (51)
| 
| 10.13 (73)
| Glenferrie Oval
| 10,136
| 20 May 1967
|- style="background:#fff;"
| 
| 16.12 (108)
| 
| 13.11 (89)
| Kardinia Park
| 21,565
| 20 May 1967
|- style="background:#fff;"
| 
| 10.13 (73)
| 
| 9.13 (67)
| Princes Park
| 43,589
| 20 May 1967
|- style="background:#fff;"
| 
| 9.4 (58)
| 
| 14.15 (99)
| Moorabbin Oval
| 32,342
| 20 May 1967
|- style="background:#fff;"
| 
| 13.15 (93)
| 
| 7.9 (51)
| MCG
| 17,582
| 20 May 1967
|- style="background:#fff;"
| 
| 4.7 (31)
| 
| 11.13 (79)
| Western Oval
| 21,278
| 20 May 1967

Round 7

|- style="background:#ccf;"
| Home team
| Home team score
| Away team
| Away team score
| Venue
| Crowd
| Date
|- style="background:#fff;"
| 
| 9.12 (66)
| 
| 16.14 (110)
| Princes Park
| 7,600
| 27 May 1967
|- style="background:#fff;"
| 
| 10.12 (72)
| 
| 6.10 (46)
| Windy Hill
| 17,684
| 27 May 1967
|- style="background:#fff;"
| 
| 16.20 (116)
| 
| 14.14 (98)
| Victoria Park
| 31,877
| 27 May 1967
|- style="background:#fff;"
| 
| 18.11 (119)
| 
| 12.9 (81)
| MCG
| 50,348
| 27 May 1967
|- style="background:#fff;"
| 
| 7.13 (55)
| 
| 6.6 (42)
| Arden Street Oval
| 10,280
| 27 May 1967
|- style="background:#fff;"
| 
| 11.12 (78)
| 
| 11.12 (78)
| Lake Oval
| 21,870
| 27 May 1967

Round 8

|- style="background:#ccf;"
| Home team
| Home team score
| Away team
| Away team score
| Venue
| Crowd
| Date
|- style="background:#fff;"
| 
| 12.8 (80)
| 
| 18.17 (125)
| Glenferrie Oval
| 13,772
| 3 June 1967
|- style="background:#fff;"
| 
| 11.19 (85)
| 
| 12.9 (81)
| Princes Park
| 30,481
| 3 June 1967
|- style="background:#fff;"
| 
| 20.18 (138)
| 
| 14.25 (109)
| Lake Oval
| 26,584
| 3 June 1967
|- style="background:#fff;"
| 
| 7.15 (57)
| 
| 12.9 (81)
| Western Oval
| 11,727
| 3 June 1967
|- style="background:#fff;"
| 
| 12.16 (88)
| 
| 13.10 (88)
| Arden Street Oval
| 16,120
| 3 June 1967
|- style="background:#fff;"
| 
| 13.5 (83)
| 
| 13.12 (90)
| MCG
| 71,946
| 3 June 1967

Round 9

|- style="background:#ccf;"
| Home team
| Home team score
| Away team
| Away team score
| Venue
| Crowd
| Date
|- style="background:#fff;"
| 
| 21.16 (142)
| 
| 6.15 (51)
| Windy Hill
| 13,277
| 10 June 1967
|- style="background:#fff;"
| 
| 19.20 (134)
| 
| 4.9 (33)
| Victoria Park
| 18,643
| 10 June 1967
|- style="background:#fff;"
| 
| 9.17 (71)
| 
| 8.13 (61)
| Moorabbin Oval
| 17,258
| 10 June 1967
|- style="background:#fff;"
| 
| 19.14 (128)
| 
| 12.17 (89)
| MCG
| 45,723
| 12 June 1967
|- style="background:#fff;"
| 
| 14.7 (91)
| 
| 13.15 (93)
| Princes Park
| 37,384
| 12 June 1967
|- style="background:#fff;"
| 
| 15.12 (102)
| 
| 9.8 (62)
| Kardinia Park
| 21,963
| 12 June 1967

Round 10

|- style="background:#ccf;"
| Home team
| Home team score
| Away team
| Away team score
| Venue
| Crowd
| Date
|- style="background:#fff;"
| 
| 16.11 (107)
| 
| 14.7 (91)
| Arden Street Oval
| 11,967
| 24 June 1967
|- style="background:#fff;"
| 
| 17.16 (118)
| 
| 12.9 (81)
| Victoria Park
| 17,363
| 24 June 1967
|- style="background:#fff;"
| 
| 24.14 (158)
| 
| 12.9 (81)
| MCG
| 38,519
| 24 June 1967
|- style="background:#fff;"
| 
| 18.14 (122)
| 
| 10.10 (70)
| Moorabbin Oval
| 27,055
| 24 June 1967
|- style="background:#fff;"
| 
| 9.11 (65)
| 
| 13.13 (91)
| Princes Park
| 12,076
| 24 June 1967
|- style="background:#fff;"
| 
| 7.12 (54)
| 
| 11.4 (70)
| Western Oval
| 19,883
| 24 June 1967

Round 11

|- style="background:#ccf;"
| Home team
| Home team score
| Away team
| Away team score
| Venue
| Crowd
| Date
|- style="background:#fff;"
| 
| 12.6 (78)
| 
| 9.18 (72)
| Kardinia Park
| 14,415
| 1 July 1967
|- style="background:#fff;"
| 
| 9.9 (63)
| 
| 15.21 (111)
| Princes Park
| 9,851
| 1 July 1967
|- style="background:#fff;"
| 
| 8.9 (57)
| 
| 14.25 (109)
| Lake Oval
| 15,520
| 1 July 1967
|- style="background:#fff;"
| 
| 8.11 (59)
| 
| 14.12 (96)
| Glenferrie Oval
| 7,530
| 1 July 1967
|- style="background:#fff;"
| 
| 9.11 (65)
| 
| 14.14 (98)
| MCG
| 30,848
| 1 July 1967
|- style="background:#fff;"
| 
| 9.16 (70)
| 
| 12.7 (79)
| Windy Hill
| 23,906
| 1 July 1967

Round 12

|- style="background:#ccf;"
| Home team
| Home team score
| Away team
| Away team score
| Venue
| Crowd
| Date
|- style="background:#fff;"
| 
| 13.15 (93)
| 
| 10.12 (72)
| Windy Hill
| 24,600
| 8 July 1967
|- style="background:#fff;"
| 
| 6.15 (51)
| 
| 12.16 (88)
| Victoria Park
| 36,121
| 8 July 1967
|- style="background:#fff;"
| 
| 10.17 (77)
| 
| 13.12 (90)
| Lake Oval
| 11,448
| 8 July 1967
|- style="background:#fff;"
| 
| 8.7 (55)
| 
| 5.22 (52)
| MCG
| 19,191
| 15 July 1967
|- style="background:#fff;"
| 
| 3.15 (33)
| 
| 11.12 (78)
| Western Oval
| 17,939
| 15 July 1967
|- style="background:#fff;"
| 
| 10.16 (76)
| 
| 10.8 (68)
| Princes Park
| 16,370
| 15 July 1967

Round 13

|- style="background:#ccf;"
| Home team
| Home team score
| Away team
| Away team score
| Venue
| Crowd
| Date
|- style="background:#fff;"
| 
| 13.12 (90)
| 
| 8.9 (57)
| Kardinia Park
| 18,780
| 22 July 1967
|- style="background:#fff;"
| 
| 19.21 (135)
| 
| 12.10 (82)
| Princes Park
| 10,800
| 22 July 1967
|- style="background:#fff;"
| 
| 19.16 (130)
| 
| 8.10 (58)
| MCG
| 20,827
| 22 July 1967
|- style="background:#fff;"
| 
| 18.6 (114)
| 
| 13.13 (91)
| Moorabbin Oval
| 31,972
| 22 July 1967
|- style="background:#fff;"
| 
| 9.8 (62)
| 
| 11.15 (81)
| Arden Street Oval
| 18,851
| 22 July 1967
|- style="background:#fff;"
| 
| 9.9 (63)
| 
| 11.21 (87)
| Glenferrie Oval
| 17,552
| 22 July 1967

Round 14

|- style="background:#ccf;"
| Home team
| Home team score
| Away team
| Away team score
| Venue
| Crowd
| Date
|- style="background:#fff;"
| 
| 8.10 (58)
| 
| 12.19 (91)
| MCG
| 29,175
| 29 July 1967
|- style="background:#fff;"
| 
| 8.10 (58)
| 
| 8.19 (67)
| Princes Park
| 13,864
| 29 July 1967
|- style="background:#fff;"
| 
| 8.14 (62)
| 
| 10.11 (71)
| Victoria Park
| 27,320
| 29 July 1967
|- style="background:#fff;"
| 
| 11.12 (78)
| 
| 7.16 (58)
| Glenferrie Oval
| 12,087
| 29 July 1967
|- style="background:#fff;"
| 
| 10.11 (71)
| 
| 5.10 (40)
| Lake Oval
| 8,635
| 29 July 1967
|- style="background:#fff;"
| 
| 8.9 (57)
| 
| 6.8 (44)
| Arden Street Oval
| 14,582
| 29 July 1967

Round 15

|- style="background:#ccf;"
| Home team
| Home team score
| Away team
| Away team score
| Venue
| Crowd
| Date
|- style="background:#fff;"
| 
| 14.15 (99)
| 
| 7.16 (58)
| Windy Hill
| 15,800
| 5 August 1967
|- style="background:#fff;"
| 
| 7.10 (52)
| 
| 6.13 (49)
| Princes Park
| 20,138
| 5 August 1967
|- style="background:#fff;"
| 
| 14.21 (105)
| 
| 13.7 (85)
| MCG
| 34,447
| 5 August 1967
|- style="background:#fff;"
| 
| 17.17 (119)
| 
| 8.8 (56)
| Moorabbin Oval
| 23,406
| 5 August 1967
|- style="background:#fff;"
| 
| 9.14 (68)
| 
| 7.8 (50)
| Kardinia Park
| 16,443
| 5 August 1967
|- style="background:#fff;"
| 
| 14.9 (93)
| 
| 12.15 (87)
| Western Oval
| 16,867
| 5 August 1967

Round 16

|- style="background:#ccf;"
| Home team
| Home team score
| Away team
| Away team score
| Venue
| Crowd
| Date
|- style="background:#fff;"
| 
| 7.12 (54)
| 
| 23.30 (168)
| Glenferrie Oval
| 19,441
| 12 August 1967
|- style="background:#fff;"
| 
| 11.7 (73)
| 
| 9.8 (62)
| Princes Park
| 32,912
| 12 August 1967
|- style="background:#fff;"
| 
| 7.12 (54)
| 
| 7.9 (51)
| MCG
| 17,039
| 12 August 1967
|- style="background:#fff;"
| 
| 9.12 (66)
| 
| 15.15 (105)
| Arden Street Oval
| 8,509
| 12 August 1967
|- style="background:#fff;"
| 
| 10.13 (73)
| 
| 4.10 (34)
| Kardinia Park
| 25,956
| 12 August 1967
|- style="background:#fff;"
| 
| 5.6 (36)
| 
| 16.14 (110)
| Lake Oval
| 10,034
| 12 August 1967

Round 17

|- style="background:#ccf;"
| Home team
| Home team score
| Away team
| Away team score
| Venue
| Crowd
| Date
|- style="background:#fff;"
| 
| 12.13 (85)
| 
| 7.11 (53)
| MCG
| 48,200
| 19 August 1967
|- style="background:#fff;"
| 
| 8.18 (66)
| 
| 9.8 (62)
| Princes Park
| 8,027
| 19 August 1967
|- style="background:#fff;"
| 
| 13.11 (89)
| 
| 12.15 (87)
| Windy Hill
| 8,700
| 19 August 1967
|- style="background:#fff;"
| 
| 9.19 (73)
| 
| 7.3 (45)
| Arden Street Oval
| 4,846
| 19 August 1967
|- style="background:#fff;"
| 
| 9.9 (63)
| 
| 21.13 (139)
| Lake Oval
| 10,034
| 19 August 1967
|- style="background:#fff;"
| 
| 12.13 (85)
| 
| 8.12 (60)
| Victoria Park
| 34,784
| 19 August 1967

Round 18

|- style="background:#ccf;"
| Home team
| Home team score
| Away team
| Away team score
| Venue
| Crowd
| Date
|- style="background:#fff;"
| 
| 15.15 (105)
| 
| 18.9 (117)
| Kardinia Park
| 34,616
| 26 August 1967
|- style="background:#fff;"
| 
| 7.11 (53)
| 
| 8.7 (55)
| Western Oval
| 10,669
| 26 August 1967
|- style="background:#fff;"
| 
| 10.22 (82)
| 
| 7.7 (49)
| Princes Park
| 15,609
| 26 August 1967
|- style="background:#fff;"
| 
| 13.13 (91)
| 
| 10.14 (74)
| Glenferrie Oval
| 13,846
| 26 August 1967
|- style="background:#fff;"
| 
| 8.12 (60)
| 
| 7.14 (56)
| MCG
| 24,282
| 26 August 1967
|- style="background:#fff;"
| 
| 14.16 (100)
| 
| 8.5 (53)
| Moorabbin Oval
| 28,862
| 26 August 1967

Ladder

Night Series Competition
The night series were held under the floodlights at Lake Oval, South Melbourne, for the teams (5th to 12th on ladder) out of the finals at the end of the season.

Final: Footscray 15.11 (101) defeated South Melbourne 8.8 (56).

Finals series

Week one

Week two

Preliminary Final

Grand final

Awards
 The 1967 VFL Premiership team was Richmond (its first since 1943).
 The VFL's leading goalkicker was Doug Wade of Geelong who kicked 96 goals (including 17 goals in the final series).
 The winner of the 1967 Brownlow Medal was Ross G. Smith of St Kilda with 24 votes.
 Footscray took the "wooden spoon" in 1967.
North Melbourne 15.13 (103) defeated  10.19 (79) in the Grand Final, held as a curtain-raiser to the seniors Grand Final at the Melbourne Cricket Ground on 23 September.

Notable events
 As well as breaking a twenty-three year premiership drought, Richmond ended a twenty-year finals drought, making the finals for the first time since 1947.
 Geelong beat Collingwood in Round 1 after a mark was awarded to Bill Ryan, at the top of the goal square just before the siren.  As the siren sounded, without the umpires hearing it, the shot at goal was touched on the mark and went through for a behind.  The umpire awarded another kick to Geelong for overstepping the mark, and this time Ryan kicked a goal to win by a point.
 Former Carlton ruckman Graham Donaldson, now coaching in Morwell, Victoria, was also the manager of one of the district's State Savings Bank of Victoria (SSB) branches. He convinced the Bank's head office to sponsor a new competition involving children (under 12), representing their VFL club and playing in their club colours, to be played during the half-time break in the senior VFL game each Saturday. The SSB Mini League, which eventually evolved into the "Little League", conducted its first matches during the 1967 VFL season.
 Fitzroy moved to Carlton's home ground, Princes Park, sharing the ground on alternate weeks.
 Hawthorn, having instituted an exhaustive schedule of pre-season and regular in-season training developed by coach John Kennedy and former star centreman, now gymnasium owner, Brendan Edwards, as a consequence of them having undertaken this gruelling schedule in addition to their normal, on-going skills training, the Hawthorn players became known as "Kennedy's Commandos".
 On Anzac Day, a representative match was played at the Melbourne Cricket Ground between the Victorian team from the 1966 Hobart Carnival, and a team representing the rest of the league. The Carnival team wore Victoria's traditional Big V guernsey; the Rest team wore a red Guernsey with blue yoke and white collar. The Rest 18.13 (121) defeated the Carnival team 9.13 (67) in front of a crowd of 15,613.
 In the Second Semi-Final between Richmond and Carlton Richmond's Neville Crowe and Carlton's John Nicholls were wrestling for the ball when Nicholls hit Crowe "in the guts", Crowe stepped back with the football grasped to his chest in his left hand and attempted to slap Nicholls with his open right hand. Crowe missed making any contact with Nicholls by about three inches. Nicholls immediately lifted his own left hand to his face, and pretended to have been badly affected, reeled away from Crowe. Despite Crowe's protests, he was reported for striking Nicholls. At the tribunal Crowe, received no assistance from Nicholls who was reluctant to admit that he was only acting. Crowe was suspended for four weeks; he missed the Grand Final, and never played VFL football again.
 At the end of the season, Harry Beitzel's squad of players drawn mainly from the VFL, known as "The Galahs", played matches in Ireland, England, and the United States.

References

Bibliography
 
 Hogan, P., The Tigers Of Old, The Richmond Football Club, (Richmond), 1996. 
 Rogers, S. & Brown, A., Every Game Ever Played: VFL/AFL Results 1897–1997 (Sixth Edition), Viking Books, (Ringwood), 1998. 
 Ross, J. (ed), 100 Years of Australian Football 1897–1996: The Complete Story of the AFL, All the Big Stories, All the Great Pictures, All the Champions, Every AFL Season Reported, Viking, (Ringwood), 1996.

External links
 1967 Season – AFL Tables
 Ben Broad, "Surprise debut a huge thrill for Tiger legend", Official AFL Website, (4 January 2008)

Australian Football League seasons
VFL season